The International Movement Writing Alphabet (IMWA) is a set of symbols that can be used to describe and record movement. Its creator, Valerie Sutton, also invented MovementWriting, a writing system which employs IMWA. It in turn has several application areas within which it is specialised.

Application areas

Sign language transcription 

Sutton SignWriting is optimised for sign languages and has the most development so far.

Dance notation 

DanceWriting is a form of dance notation.

Mimestry notation 

MimeWriting is for classic mimestry.

Kinesiology 

SportsWriting is for the kinesiology of ice skating and gymnastics.

Identification numbers 

The IMWA has more than 27,000 elements that are represented by unique identification numbers. Each identification number specifies six attributes——as dash-separated values. The symbol is specified with a three-digit value whereas all other attributes use a two-digit value (e.g., 01-01-001-01-01-01).

There are eight categories: hand, movement, face, head, upper body, full body, space, and punctuation.

There are 40 groups. The  are based on the 40 groups.

History 

The IMWA was originally designed for describing sign language and consequently was named Sutton's Sign Symbol Sequence (SSS) by its inventor, Valerie Sutton. The original symbol set, SSS-95, was limited in size due to memory constraints in personal computers at the time. The SSS-99 symbol set expanded the number of symbols, and the SSS-2002 set was the first to use the current identification numbering system. The final version, SSS-2004, was renamed International Movement Writing Alphabet (SSS-IMWA) to reflect its usefulness in applications beyond sign language.

External links 

 MovementWriting
 IMWA Design Documents
 IMWA Keyboard Design

writing systems
constructed scripts